David MacCreedy is an English film, television and theatre actor, as well as being a director and film producer. He is best known for his role as Cpl Pete Polson in the television series All Quiet on the Preston Front and for playing Tony in the rugby film Up 'n' Under.

Career

Television
Whilst at drama school, MacCreedy was in the Territorial Army (now the Army Reserve) which helped with his audition for Cpl Polson in All Quiet on the Preston Front. He initially auditioned with Stephen Tompkinson whom he already knew and they worked well together in securing the roles in the programme.

Director
David filmed, produced and directed a film about the South Atlantic Medal Association (SAMA) visit to the Falkland Islands in November 2002 The event was filmed almost 20 years after the Falklands Conflict.

Personal life
MacCreedy was born and raised in Workington, Cumbria, England. His parents still live in the town. MacCreedy  has a daughter, Ellie MacCreedy and a son Charlie MacCreedy.

He was at drama college with Phillip Glenister, Rufus Sewell and James Nesbitt. He appeared alongside Nesbitt in an episode of Murphy's Law.

Filmography

References

External links

1969 births
Living people
English male stage actors
English male television actors
20th-century English male actors
21st-century English male actors
People from Workington